Glue sticks are solid and hard adhesives in twist or push-up tubes. Users can apply glue by holding the open tube to keep their fingers clean and rubbing the exposed stick against a surface.

Applications 
Most glue sticks are designed to glue paper and card stock together, and are not as strong as some liquid-based variants. They can be used for craft and design, office use and at school. There are several varieties: permanent, washable, acid-free, non-toxic, solvent-free, and dyed (e.g. to see where the glue is being applied).

Brands 
In 1969, the German company Henkel invented the glue stick after studying the "twist-up ease" and convenience of lipstick applicators. The product was released under the Pritt Stick brand. By 1971 the Pritt Stick was being sold in 38 countries, by 2001 in 121. The first solvent-free, multipurpose glue stick that could be used for other materials (e.g. wood, glass and some plastics) was the "PowerPritt", which was put on the market in 2003. There is also a "Pritt X", launched in 2010.

In the UK, the name "Pritt Stick" is often used as a generic term for any glue stick.

Glue sticks are made under many brands and each may have different features to it. Various brands, such as Scotch, Elmer's, UHU, Kores, Giotto, UFO, Snopake, and Bostik U-Stick make glue sticks. Generic brands like M&G also manufacture glue sticks, utilising the twist action.

Sizes 
Glue sticks can come in many sizes, the most common ones are 8g, 25g, 36g, and 43g.

Material 
Known materials to be used for glue sticks are PVA or PVP. As of the year 2000, the Henkel company no longer uses PVP in Pritt, but makes use of natural starch.

Composition 
Glue stick compositions are often proprietary and vary by manufacturer and type. The 3M product contains the following ingredients:

The reportable composition of a Pritt Stick is as follows:

Other brands use, e.g., polyvinylpyrrolidone (PVP) as the glue substance.

References 

Adhesives
Brand name materials
Henkel brands
German inventions
Products introduced in 1969